The Social Movement for Renewal is a political party in the Democratic Republic of Congo. The party won 27 out of 500 seats in the parliamentary elections. In the 19 January 2007 Senate elections, the party won 3 out of 108 seats.

The current party president, Pierre Lumbi, is also the vice president of Ensemble pour le Changement, the political coalition supporting Moïse Katumbi for the 2018 presidential election.

References

Political parties in the Democratic Republic of the Congo
Social democratic parties
Socialism in the Democratic Republic of the Congo